Sanders Bohlke (born February 28, 1984) is an American songwriter and recording artist born in Sardis, Mississippi. His music has been variously described as experimental folk and indie alternative. He released his self-titled debut album in 2006 and has since put out a second studio album, Ghost Boy, in 2012, the EP The Night in 2015, as well as numerous singles, most recently "Never Wake", in July 2018.

Early life and education
Bohlke was born in Sardis, Mississippi and raised in the Mississippi Delta region. He attended the University of Mississippi in Oxford.

Career
He released his first album, Sanders Bohlke, in 2006. He released his sophomore album, Ghost Boy, in 2012. The album was produced by Jeffrey Cain of Remy Zero and features engineering and mixing work by Darrell Thorp (Nate Ruess, Beck, Foster the People).

In 2016, Bohlke formed the duo Rookie Season with drummer Brad Odum. The project has a distinctly R&B flavour, unlike Bohlke's solo material.

Bohlke's other musical activities include a collaboration with Olga Bell (Dirty Projectors), and an electro-soul project called Svibes with German EDM producer Chris Deluca (Funkstörung, Wu-Tang Clan, Björk).

Bohlke composed the music for the short films Jack's Apocalypse (2015), Red Folder (2016), Passage (2017), and Washed Away (2019). He has also worked on the short film Ricochet, in which he got co-directing, production, and soundtrack credits.

Bohlke's music has appeared on various TV shows including The Vampire Diaries, Private Practice, Grey's Anatomy, Suits, Revenge, and the films Love and Honor and Extremely Loud & Incredibly Close.

Discography

Solo
Studio albums
 Sanders Bohlke (2006)
 Ghost Boy (2012)

EPs
 The Night (2015)

Soundtracks
 Jack's Apocalypse (2015)
 Red Folder (2016)
 Passage (2017)
 Washed Away (2019)
 Ricochet (2019)

Singles
 "The Weight of Us" (2009)
 "Somewhere the War" (2009)
 "Search and Destroy" (2009)
 "Misdirection" (2010)
 "I'm Gonna Make It" (2010)
 "Quiet Ye Voices" (2010)
 "Nearly Summer" (2012)
 "Elevate" (2012)
 "Soldier" (2014)
 "Never Wake" (2018)

Appearances
 "He Will Not Cry Out" He Will Not Cry Out (Bifrost Arts, 2013)
 "I Can't Love You" Killers (Funkstörung, 2015)

Rookie Season
 The Collide (2017)

Svibes
 "Back & Forth" (2019)
 "Don't Let Go" (2019)
 "Quicksand" (2019)
 "Dreaming of the Pause" (2019)
 "Heathen" (2018)
 "What You Need" (2018)
 "The Ra Ra Ra" (2018)
 "Colored Walls/Fly Low" (2018)

References

External links
 Sanders Bohlke on Communicating Vessels
 Rookie Season official website
 Svibes Official website

1984 births
Living people
American composers
American folk singers
People from Sardis, Mississippi
Singer-songwriters from Mississippi